Te Paea Cherrington (c.1878–30 September 1937) was a New Zealand tribal leader. Of Māori descent, she identified with the Nga Puhi iwi. She was born in Otiria, Northland, New Zealand on c.1878.

References

1870s births
1937 deaths
Ngāpuhi people
People from the Northland Region